The 1989 National Soccer League season was the sixty-sixth season under the National Soccer League (NSL) name. The season concluded on September 18, 1989, with Toronto Italia defending their seventh consecutive NSL Championship by finishing first in the First Division. Toronto Italia also claimed the NSL Canadian Championship by defeating Montreal Ramblers of the Quebec National Soccer League (LNSQ) on September 20, 1989, at the Claude Robilliard Stadium in Montreal, Quebec. The NSL Cup was also successfully defended by Toronto Croatia. Croatia would also defeat LNSQ Cup champions St. Leonard to win the Canada Cup.

Overview  
Changes were announced during the offseason regarding the structure of the league with the Youth Division being reformed into the Second Division. The restructuring of the division marked the return of the NSL's Second Division since the 1978 season, but the promotion and relegation system wasn't reactivated between the two divisions. The reforms also permitted the second division clubs to participate in the NSL Cup. The membership in the First Division was decreased to eight teams with London Marconi requesting a leave of absence. Chile Lindo's NSL franchise was revoked for continuous problems regarding fan violence, and the Mississauga Lakers disbanded their team. The league had another presence in the Niagara territory in the Second Division with a team named Niagara City, and a notable returnee was Oshawa Italia that previously played in the 1962 NSL season.  

The lone expansion franchise was Toronto Macedonia Stars, which provided a Macedonian presence within the league since the 1977 season.Toronto Italia was involved in a friendly match against noted Portuguese side S.L. Benfica. The match was played on June 7, 1989, with Benfica defeating Toronto by a score of 3-1 at Varsity Stadium.

Teams

Final standings

References

External links
RSSSF CNSL page
thecnsl.com - 1989 season

 
1989–90 domestic association football leagues
National Soccer League
1989